Brooks is a given name. It may refer to:

Brooks Atkinson (1894–1984), American theater critic
Brooks Bollinger (born 1979), American football player
Brooks Conrad (born 1980), American baseball player
Brooks Cryder (born 1955), American soccer player
Brooks Douglass (1963-2020), American film producer, actor, politician, and lawyer
Brooks Foster (born 1986), American football player
Brooks Gray (born 1975), Canadian actor and film producer
Brooks Hansen, American author and illustrator
Brooks Haxton (born 1950), American poet and translator
Brooks Hays (1898–1981), American politician and religious leader
Brooks Headley, American musician and chef
Brooks Holder (1914–1986), American baseball player
Bubba Jennings, American basketball player and coach
Brooks Johnson (born 1934), American sprinter and track coach 
Brooks A. Keel, American university president
Brooks Kerr (born 1951), American jazz pianist
Brooks Kieschnick (born 1972), American baseball player
Brooks Koepka (born 1990), American golfer
Brooks Kriske (born 1994), American professional baseball player
Brooks Laich (born 1983), Canadian ice hockey player
Brooks Landgraf (born 1981), American politician
Brooks Lee (born 2001), American baseball player
Brooks Macek (born 1992), German-Canadian ice hockey player
Brooks McCormick (1917–2006), American businessman and philanthropist
Brooks Mileson (1947–2008), English businessman and philanthropist
Brooks Moore, Canadian voice actor
Brooks K. Mould, American music publisher
Brooks Newmark (born 1958), American-born English member of parliament
Brooks Orpik (born 1980), American ice hockey player
Brooks Otis (1908–1977), American classical scholar
Brooks Pate, American chemist
Brooks Pennington Jr. (1925–1996), American businessman, politician, and philanthropist
Brooks Pounders (born 1990), American professional baseball player
Brooks Reed (born 1987), American football player
Brooks Robinson (born 1937), American baseball player
Brooks D. Simpson (born 1957), American historian
Brooks Stevens (1911–1995), American industrial designer
Brooks Thompson (1970–2016), American basketball player and coach
Brooks Wackerman (born 1977), American rock drummer
Brooks Wheelan (born 1986), American comedian and actor
Brooks Williams (born 1958), American folk musician
Brooks D. Williams (born 1978), American women's basketball coach
A. Brooks Harris (born 1935), American physicist
D. Brooks Smith (born 1951), U.S. federal judge
E. Brooks Holifield (born 1942), American religious historian
G. Brooks Earnest (1902–1992), American college president
L. Brooks Leavitt (1878–1941), American financier and antiquarian
L. Brooks Patterson (1939–2019), American lawyer and politician

See also
Brooksie, a list of people and fictional characters with the nickname

English masculine given names